Newton Township is one of the 25 townships of Licking County, Ohio, United States. As of the 2010 census, the population was 3,219, of whom 2,846 lived in the unincorporated portions of the township.

Geography
Located in the northern part of the county, it borders the following townships and city:
Washington Township - north
Eden Township - northeast
Mary Ann Township - east
Madison Township - southeast corner
Newark Township - south
Newark - south
Granville Township - southwest
McKean Township - west

The village of St. Louisville is located in the township's north.

Name and history
It is one of five Newton Townships statewide.

Government
The township is governed by a three-member board of trustees, who are elected in November of odd-numbered years to a four-year term beginning on the following January 1. Two are elected in the year after the presidential election and one is elected in the year before it. There is also an elected township fiscal officer, who serves a four-year term beginning on April 1 of the year after the election, which is held in November of the year before the presidential election. Vacancies in the fiscal officership or on the board of trustees are filled by the remaining trustees.

References

External links

County website

Townships in Licking County, Ohio
Townships in Ohio